The 1979 Tel Aviv Open was a men's tennis tournament played on hard courts that was part of the 1979 Colgate-Palmolive Grand Prix. It was the inaugural edition of the tournament and was played at the Israel Tennis Centers in the Tel Aviv District city of Ramat HaSharon, Israel from October 8 through October 13, 1979. Second-seeded Tom Okker won the singles title.

Finals

Singles

 Tom Okker defeated  Per Hjertquist 6–4, 6–3 
 It was Okker's 6th title of the year and the 87th of his career.

Doubles

 Ilie Năstase /  Tom Okker defeated  Mike Cahill /  Colin Dibley 7–5, 6–4 
 It was Nastase's 5th title of the year and the 98th of his career. It was Okker's 5th title of the year and the 86th of his career.

References

External links
 ITF tournament edition details

 
Tel Aviv Open, 1979
Tel Aviv Open
Tel Aviv Open